Ludwig "Bubi" Bründl (born 23 November 1946 in Munich) is a retired German football player. He played eight seasons in the Bundesliga between 1965 and 1975. TSV 1860 München won their first and only Bundesliga title in 1966 during Bründl's first season with the senior team, although he made no appearance on the field. Bründl enjoyed the most successful spell of his career with Eintracht Braunschweig, where he scored a total of 67 goals in 148 games in all official competitions between 1971 and 1975. This includes ten goals in six games in the 1971–72 UEFA Cup, which made Bründl the tournament's first top scorer.

Honours

Club
 Bundesliga: 1965–66
 Bundesliga runner-up: 1966–67

Individual
 UEFA Cup top scorer: 1971–72

References

External links
 

1946 births
Living people
German footballers
Eintracht Braunschweig players
TSV 1860 Munich players
1. FC Köln players
Stuttgarter Kickers players
Association football forwards
Footballers from Munich
Bundesliga players
20th-century German people
West German footballers